Spulerina castaneae is a moth of the family Gracillariidae. It is known from Japan (Honshū) and the Russian Far East.

The wingspan is 8.5–9 mm.

The larvae feed on Quercus species and Castanea crenata. They mine the stem of their host plant.

References

Spulerina
Moths of Japan
Moths described in 1988